Compton or Compton Gifford is a suburb of Plymouth in England.

Once a small village, it was developed in the 1930s and now lies between the suburbs of Peverell Mannamead and Efford. There are two parts, Higher and Lower Compton named after two farms and now distinguished by their respective public houses.

Although essentially infill development between older larger areas, Compton is distinctive in character.

History
The earliest evidence of man in Compton, is from around 3000 BC. At this time, Neolithic stone axes which have been found in Compton, 
were being made in Penzance, Callington and Camborne. They may have been used by farmers, or dropped en route to other settlements.

Around 800 AD, the Manor of Compton was appearing on maps, Coombe (a wooded valley) Ton (the Saxon word for farm).

In 1086 the Domesday book had this entry for Compton;

"Stephen holds Compton from Iudhael. Oswulf held it before 1066. It paid tax for 1 hide and 1 virgate of land. Land for 4 ploughs, 
which are there; 2 slaves, 6 villagers, and 4 smallholders.

Meadow 1 acre, Underwood 20 acres. 5 cattle, 2 pigs, 52 sheep. Value formerly and now 30 shillings."

Compton is mentioned in 1238 as it was on the route to the new Plym Bridge, the route to Plympton and 
beyond was through Compton and Eggbuckland. Before this, it had been necessary to travel much further 
north to cross the Plym at high tide, as the river in those days from Plym bridge to Marsh mills was just mud flats in a wide creek. 
To cross the river at low tide the ebb-ford (Efford) could be used.

The Gifford in Compton Gifford, dates back to around 1100 AD when the granddaughter of Guy de Bockland, 
Isabella brought the estate to her husband Osbert Giffard. The estate continued in their family until 1342.

Only recently has Compton become part of Plymouth. Around 1596 for example, 
the town criers of Plymouth, Thomas Edwarde and Vincent, were recorded as relocating lame men, beggars and 
other undesirables to Compton, Plympton and Plymstock, an effective way of removing the problem!

Compton was not left out of the Civil War of 1642−46. It is recorded that Prince Maurice advanced from Compton village around the head of Lipson Creek, but after some bloody fighting, was defeated by the Roundheads and the tide. At this time his headquarters were at Widey Court.

By 1730 Compton was part of the Culme estate, and it was not until the last member of that family died in 1804 that, 
with a population of around fifty, Compton began to grow. At this stage there were not many buildings, of these 
The Compton Inn is probably the oldest, with walls up to four feet thick, it was an old farmhouse, then a granary, a tanners and a cobblers shop.

But from about 1857 it has been a pub. Priory House in Lower Compton is one of the last remaining large houses of this period, 
and was built by a Captain Bremner. When it was sold to a builder, Mr. Charles Fox, he decided to build on the lawn. 
As a result of this, we now have Priory Lawn Terrace, Charles Terrace and Florence Terrace, which was named after his wife. 
The Rising Sun was originally cottages, and inside, the original door knockers for each cottage can be seen. Once turned into an alehouse, 
in the 1700s, its first name, presumably after its then owner, was Hoopers ale house. As you look at the scene, it is still easy to imagine horses 
being led up Chapel Way, to wait by the wall outside the pub, or perhaps be led into the shippen next to the pub, which is now Read's D.I.Y. Stores. 
They would have been on their way down to Henders Corner, the stage coach stop on the way from Plympton to Saltash.

In around 1850, horse trams were now using Henders Corner as a terminus, and by 1870 the Anglican parish of Emmanuel, Compton Gifford was born. 
The centre for this parish was a small church built on land offered by Betsy and Elizabeth Revel. At the turn of the century the bustling little village 
was still mainly agricultural, with cows, market gardens, sheep, goats, pigs and horses still in evidence. It was a popular pastime for Plymothians 
to take a stroll out to Compton, to take tea at one of the many places offering some refreshment from their front gardens or parlours.

Compton even had a reputation as a spa, due to a piped off water chute, just near what is now Crowndale Road. Granny Daw, who lived in Beckham Place, 
built a reputation for being able to cure most ailments with her remedies, and a little help from the water.

In 1896 the Tything of Compton Gifford was incorporated into the Borough of Plymouth. This was not a popular decision with the people of Compton, as the rates in Compton 
were roughly half that of Plymouth. However the deed was done, and Plymothians lived to regret it, as it cost a great deal of 
money to bring Compton up to the Borough's standards.

Around 1900 the first telephones were reaching Compton, and by the 1920s the first cars were starting to appear, although, with railway stations 
at Laira, Lipson, Mutley and North Hill, the tram terminus at Henders Corner and Baskerville's horse tram, public transport was plentiful.

In these times there were still plenty of local businesses. Apart from the market gardeners and farms, there was a slaughterhouse, 
a rubbish collection business, a brickworks, which when disused was turned into a mushroom farm. Of course there were a large amount of shops, 
a fishmonger, cobblers, Post Office, general stores, two dairies, fish and chip shop, and even an undertakers.

From the early 1900s onward Lower Compton had a school. When Mary Leigh took over as Headmistress in 1936 the school had 82 pupils. Some classes had to walk up the hill to the Methodist hall to be taught. There was terrible poverty during this time, and she managed to obtain some boots for the children who had none, but she had to punch holes in the uppers, so that the parents would not sell them off to buy food. By the time she left in 1947 the school had 300 pupils, and Compton School was one of the best in Plymouth.

In 2022 Dylan Tippetts became a city councillor for Compton, he is the first transgender city councillor in Plymouth and the first Labour councillor for Compton.

References

Suburbs of Plymouth, Devon
Former manors in Devon